Jerome Fontamillas (born June 20, 1967) is an American musician. Fontamillas has played in several bands, notably with industrial rock band Mortal and alternative rock band Fold Zandura, with longtime musical partner Jyro Xhan. Since 2003, he has played the keyboards, the guitar, and other instruments, as well as sung backing vocals in Switchfoot, with which he has released eight studio albums.

Early life and education 

Fontamillas was born on June 20, 1967, in Pasay in the Philippines. When he was three years old, his family moved to the United States, where they lived in Chicago and then California. He started taking piano lessons when he was a child.

In 1985, Fontamillas graduated from Monterey Bay Academy in Watsonville, California.

Career 

In 1988, Fontamillas, Jyro Xhan, Ray Tongpo and Wilson Peralta released a six-song demo tape, titled Wish Fifteen, on Blue Genius Music as Mortal Wish. Four years later, they signed with Intense Records and changed their name to Mortal. Fontamillas would continue to play with Mortal until 1996 and played in Fold Zandura, also with Xhan, between 1995 and 1999.

In 2000, Fontamillas quit his day job and started touring with Switchfoot shortly before the release of their third album, Learning to Breathe. He became an official member of the band in 2003. His first release with Switchfoot was their 2003 break-through album The Beautiful Letdown.

In 2002, Jyro and Fontamillas released a Mortal reunion album, Nu-En-Jin.

Fontamillas is also a producer for the following independent acts:
 The Echoing Green, Echoing Green (1998)
 Starflyer 59, I Predict A Clone (1994)
 March, Velvet Blue Music, (1999)

Personal life 

Fontamillas is a Seventh-day Adventist.

He married his wife Kristi, who is a photographer, in December 2005. The couple have two sons, Parker Lennon (born in January 2010) and Jackson (born on October 2, 2013).

On December 20, 2018, Switchfoot announced that Fontamillas had cancer and nine days later they stated that a tumor has been removed and it had not spread or attached to any organs.

Discography

Mortal 

 Lusis (1992)
 Fathom (1993)
 Intense Live Series Vol. 5 (1993)
 Wake (1994)
 Pura (1995)
 Mortal (1996)
 Nu-En-Jin (2002)

Fold Zandura 

 Fold Zandura (1995)
 Return (1997)
 The White 7" (1997)
 Ultraforever (1997)
 King Planet EP (1999)

Switchfoot 

 The Beautiful Letdown (2003)
 Nothing Is Sound (2005)
 Oh! Gravity. (2006)
 Hello Hurricane (2009)
 Vice Verses (2011)
 Fading West (2013)
 "The Edge Of The Earth" (2014)
Where the Light Shines Through (2016)
Native Tongue (2019)
 "Covers" (2021)
"interrobang" (2021)

References 

1967 births
American rock guitarists
American male guitarists
American keyboardists
American record producers
American musicians of Filipino descent
Living people
American Seventh-day Adventists
Switchfoot members
Grammy Award winners
20th-century American guitarists